Giampaolo or Gianpaolo is an Italian male given name or surname. Its English translation is "John Paul". It is often short for "Giovanni Paolo".

Notable people with the name include:

Given name
Gianpaolo Ambrosi, Italian luger
Gianpaolo Bellini, Italian footballer
Giampaolo Caruso, Italian road bicycle racer
Giampaolo Mazza, Sammarinese manager
Giampaolo Menichelli, Italian footballer
Gianpaolo Mondini, Italian former road bicycle racer
Giampaolo Pazzini, Italian footballer
Giampaolo Rugarli, Italian novelist
Giampaolo Stuani, Italian pianist
Giampaolo Urlando, Italian hammer thrower

Surname
Dominic Giampaolo, American software developer
Federico Giampaolo, Italian footballer
Marco Giampaolo, Italian football manager

See also
Giovanni (name)
Paolo (disambiguation)

Italian masculine given names
Surnames
Italian-language surnames

it:Giampaolo